The 1942 Princeton Tigers football team was an American football team that represented Princeton University as an independent during the 1942 college football season. In its fifth and final season under head coach Tad Wieman, the team compiled a 3–5–1 record and was outscored  by a total of 135 to 109. Dick Schmon was Princeton's team captain. Princeton played its 1942 home games at Palmer Stadium in Princeton, New Jersey.

Schedule

References

Princeton
Princeton Tigers football seasons
Princeton Tigers football